The Rota white-eye or Rota bridled white-eye (Zosterops rotensis) is a species of bird in the family Zosteropidae. It is endemic to Northern Mariana Islands.

Its natural habitat is subtropical or tropical moist lowland forests. It is threatened by habitat loss.

References

External links
BirdLife Species Factsheet

Rota white-eye
Birds of the Northern Mariana Islands
Rota white-eye
Taxonomy articles created by Polbot
ESA endangered species